Alan Roberts (born 8 December 1964) is an English former footballer who made 203 appearances in the Football League playing for Middlesbrough, Darlington, Sheffield United and Lincoln City in the 1980s. He played on the right wing, and had pace and a direct style.

Roberts was a regular in the Sheffield United side promoted from the Third Division in 1988–89, his only full season with the club, and provided numerous assists for the forward line. Transfer-listed at his own request early the following season, he joined Lincoln City in October 1989 for a £60,000 fee. He played his last match on 1 January 1990 before his career was ended at the age of 25 because of injury.

Roberts' son Jordan became a footballer, playing in college and professionally in the United States.

References

1964 births
Living people
Footballers from Newcastle upon Tyne
English footballers
Association football wingers
Middlesbrough F.C. players
Darlington F.C. players
Sheffield United F.C. players
Lincoln City F.C. players
English Football League players